Pavel Leonidovich Pechyonkin (born 30 January 1991) is a former Russian football midfielder.

Club career
He made his Russian Football National League debut for FC Ural Yekaterinburg on 4 June 2011 in a game against FC Yenisey Krasnoyarsk. That was his only season in the FNL.

External links
 
 
 

1991 births
People from Sverdlovsk Oblast
Living people
Russian footballers
Association football midfielders
FC Lokomotiv Moscow players
FC Ural Yekaterinburg players
FC Lada-Tolyatti players
FC Nosta Novotroitsk players
Sportspeople from Sverdlovsk Oblast